Play Kurt Weill may refer to:
The Young Gods Play Kurt Weill, 1991 album by the Young Gods
Tethered Moon Play Kurt Weill, 1995 album by Tethered Moon